Ajoy Kumar Mukherjee (15 April 1901 – 27 May 1986) was an Indian independence activist and politician who served three short terms as the fourth and sixth Chief Minister of West Bengal. He hailed from Tamluk, Purba Medinipur district, West Bengal.

Ajoy Kumar Mukherjee born in Tamluk, West Bengal, India in 1901, he was one of the leaders of Tamralipta Jatiya Sarkar (Tamrlipta National Government), which came into effect on 17 December 1942 during the Quit India Movement, a programme of civil disobedience launched in India in 1942. He was greatly influenced by Swami Vivekananda. Earlier a member of the Indian National Congress, he later became a leader in the Bangla Congress, which co-governed with the Communist Party of India (Marxist) in two United Front governments in the 1960s and 1970s. He held the chief ministerial position in both these governments, from March to November 1967, and again from February 1969 to March 1970.

In the year 1967 Ajoy Mukherjee defeated Prafulla Chandra Sen another Gandhian at Arambagh assembly constituency and became chief minister of West Bengal after Prafulla Chandra Sen. Architect of Ajoy Mukherjee's victory at Arambagh was Narayan Ch Ghosh the then students leader at Arambagh. Narayan Ghosh accompanied Ajoy Mukherjee in a boat for several days to see several flood affected areas in Arambagh & Ghatal subdivision during 1968. People of flood affected areas were enthused by Ajoy Mukherjee for his tireless move to stand for them.

Ajoy Mukherjee with some of his closed colleagues, viz. Pranab Mukherjee etc., joined Indian National Congress leaving Sushil Dhara- his long term associates. He was offered ministerial post at Centre by Indira Gandhi, but Ajoy Mukherjee saying his age and health condition had pushed Pranab Mukherjee. Pranab Mukherjee became State Minister in the Indian Cabinet.

He was awarded the Padma Vibhushan award in 1977 from Government of India.

His brother Biswanath Mukherjee was the husband of Geeta Mukherjee, a communist MP. Ajoy's niece Kalyani (daughter of another brother) was married to Mohan Kumaramangalam and was the mother of Rangarajan Kumaramangalam and Lalitha Kumaramangalam.

Mukherjee died on 27 May 1986 in Calcutta.

References

External links

 

Politicians from Kolkata
Recipients of the Padma Vibhushan in public affairs
Chief Ministers of West Bengal
1901 births
1986 deaths
20th-century Bengalis
Bengali Hindus
People from Purba Medinipur district
University of Calcutta alumni
Chief ministers from Indian National Congress
Indian National Congress politicians from West Bengal
20th-century Indian politicians
Bangla Congress politicians
People from Tamluk